Terasaka (written: 寺坂 or 寺阪) is a Japanese surname. Notable people with the surname include:

Kento Terasaka (寺坂 研人), Japanese manga artist
Terasaka Yakuro Masatsune (赤坂 弥九郎 政雅, 1567 – 1594), chief priest at the Buddhist temple Tennenji near Kyoto
Terasaka Kichiemon (寺坂 吉右衛門, 1665 – 1747), Japanese Samurai

Fictional characters
, a character in the manga series Assassination Classroom

Japanese-language surnames